The Ford Equator is a mid-size crossover SUV built by the JMC-Ford joint venture.

Overview

The Equator is a three-row SUV that slots directly above the Everest in the JMC-Ford SUV line-up.

The instrumental panel of the Equator is equipped with a pair of 12.3-inch screens used for the digital instrument cluster and infotainment system. The interior of the Equator also feature wooden accents and a rotary gear selector. The infotainment system includes Ford’s Co-Pilot360 system and is sold only as a six-seater.

The Equator is powered by a transverse-mounted 2.0-liter turbocharged EcoBoost engine based on the JX4G20 petrol engine developed by JMC and AVL which produces . Production of the car is planned to start around the first quarter of 2021.

Equator Sport/Territory 
The shorter two-row version was released at the Guangzhou Auto Show in November 2021 as the Equator Sport. The Equator Sport is powered by a 1.5 EcoBoost 4G15F6C engine rated at 125 kW (168 hp). The model is exported to markets outside China as the Ford Territory.

Sales

Equator Sport/Territory

References

External links

 

Equator
Cars of China
Cars introduced in 2021
Mid-size sport utility vehicles
Crossover sport utility vehicles
Front-wheel-drive vehicles
All-wheel-drive vehicles